Tirami Su is an album by jazz guitarist Al Di Meola that was released in 1987.

Track listing 
All songs by Al Di Meola except where noted
 "Beijing Demons" – 6:22
 "Arabella" – 7:08
 "Smile from a Stranger" – 5:40
 "Rhapsody of Fire" – 5:03
 "Song to the Pharaoh Kings" (Chick Corea) – 8:44
 "Andonea" – 3:01
 "Maraba" (Di Meola, Clara Sandroni) – 5:18
 "Song with a View" – 6:20
 "Tirami Su, Part 1" – 1:10

Personnel
 Al Di Meola – guitar
 Kei Akagi – keyboards
 Anthony Jackson – bass guitar
 Harvie S – bass
 Tom Brechtlein – drums
 Mino Cinelu – percussion
 Ze Renato – vocals
 Clara Sandroni – vocals

Chart performance

References

Al Di Meola albums
1987 albums
Manhattan Records albums